Alkedo is a preserved Roman shipwreck that sank in the 1st century AD, and was discovered during a construction project in Pisa, Italy.

Excavation 
In 1998 construction began on a control center for the Rome-Genoa train line at San Rossore, and during the project a series of shipwrecks were discovered. In total over thirty shipwrecks were discovered on the site, including Alkedo.

Characteristics 

Constructed of holm oak and pine, with an insert in the bow made of oak, it was rowed by twelve oarsmen, and used as a pleasure craft. The ship's nearly intact hull has been preserved well enough to make out the inscription on a tablet nailed to one of the rower's benches; the inscription states the five letters that make up the word "ALK (E) DO". Translated from Latin to mean "seagull", which is thought to be the name of the ship. Traces of red and white were visible on the external sides of the ship during its excavation, which indicates it was once painted. It is displayed next to a full size replica in the Museum of Ancient Ships in Pisa, Italy.

See also 
 Arles Rhône 3
 Marsala Ship
Roman ship of Marausa

Notes

References

External links 
 

1998 archaeological discoveries
Ancient Roman ships
Ancient shipwrecks
Shipwrecks of Italy
Archaeological discoveries in Italy
Roman archaeology
Ships preserved in museums